The 8th European Cross Country Championships were held at Thun in Switzerland on 9 December 2001. Serhiy Lebid took his second title in the men's competition and Yamna Belkacem won the women's race.

Results

Men individual 9.15 km

Total 77 competitors

Men teams

Total 12 teams

Women individual 4.65 km

Total 84 competitors

Women teams

Total 13 teams

Junior men individual 6.15 km

Total 90 competitors

Junior men teams

Total 13 teams

Junior women individual 3.15 km

Total 84 competitors

Junior women teams

Total 15 teams

References

External links
 Database containing all results between 1994–2007

European Cross Country Championships
European Cross Country Championships
International athletics competitions hosted by Switzerland
2001 in Swiss sport
Cross country running in Switzerland
December 2001 sports events in Europe
Thun